In mathematics, Loewner order is the partial order defined by the convex cone of positive semi-definite matrices. This order is usually employed to generalize the definitions of monotone and concave/convex scalar functions to monotone and concave/convex Hermitian valued functions. These functions arise naturally in matrix and operator theory and have applications in many areas of physics and engineering.

Definition 
Let A and B be two Hermitian matrices of order n. We say that A ≥ B if A − B is positive semi-definite. Similarly, we say that A > B if A − B is positive definite.

Properties 
When A and B are real scalars (i.e. n = 1), the Loewner order reduces to the usual ordering of R.  Although some familiar properties of the usual order of R are also valid when n ≥ 2, several properties are no longer valid. For instance, the comparability of two matrices may no longer be valid. In fact, if
 and  then neither A ≥ B or B ≥ A holds true.

Moreover, since A and B are Hermitian matrices, their eigenvalues are all real numbers.
If λ1(B) is the maximum eigenvalue of B and λn(A) the minimum eigenvalue of A, a sufficient criterion to have A ≥ B is that λn(A) ≥ λ1(B).  If A or B is a multiple of the identity matrix, then this criterion is also necessary.

The Loewner order does not have the least-upper-bound property, and therefore does not form a lattice.

See also 
 Trace inequalities

References 
 
 
 

Linear algebra
Matrix theory